Fabric 25 is a DJ mix compilation album by Carl Craig released as part of the Fabric Mix Series.

Track listing
  Ying Yang Twins - Wait (The Whisper Song) - TVT Records  – 2:29
  Carl Craig - Angel (Caya Dub) - Planet E  – 3:50
  Trickski - Sweat - Sonar Kollektiv  – 4:34
  Kerri Chandler - Bar A Thym - Nite Grooves/King St  – 5:42
  Just One - Love2Love (Phlash Edit) - Neroli Productions  – 3:33
  Megablast - Jupita (Stereotyp Remix) - Luv Lite Recordings  – 4:27
  Scott Grooves - The Journey - From The Studio Of Scott Grooves  – 2:17
  Africanism - Imbalaye - Yellow Productions  – 2:17
  Blaze/UDA/Barbara Tucker - Most Precious Love (DF Future 3000 Instrumental) - Nite Grooves/King St  – 5:46
  Rayon - The Panther (Rubber Re-Edit) - Crosstown Rebel Music/Rebelone  – 4:33
  Soundstream - 3rd Movement - Soundstream  – 4:03
  Dark Comedy - Good God - Art of Dance Records  – 5:12
  D'Malicious - Alive - Wave Music  – 4:25
  Pasta Boys - Limit - Disco Inn  – 4:40
  DJ Yoav B. - Energize - Wabi Sabi/Nomorewords  – 4:46
  Nick Petty/Shamus Coghlan - Crushing - Missing Unit  – 2:12
  Carl Craig - Darkness - Planet E  – 4:34
  Tokyo Black Star - Blade Dancer (Dixon Edit) - Sonar Kollektiv  – 3:45

References

External links
Fabric: Fabric 25

Fabric (club) albums
2005 compilation albums